Armin Kremer (born 4 December 1968, Crivitz, East Germany) is a German rally driver who is currently competing in the World Rally Championship in the WRC-2 class. He began rallying in the WRC at the 1995 Rally de Portugal and has entered various rallies since. He won the European Rally Championship in 2001 driving a Toyota Corolla WRC and the Asia-Pacific Rally Championship in 2003 in a Mitsubishi Lancer Evo VII.

Career results

WRC results

PWRC results

WRC-2 results

* Season still in progress.

WRC-3 results

External links

Armin Kremer at eWRC-results.com

1968 births
Living people
People from Crivitz
People from Bezirk Schwerin
German rally drivers
World Rally Championship drivers
European Rally Championship drivers
Intercontinental Rally Challenge drivers
M-Sport drivers